Vagabond was a Norwegian melodic hard rock band fronted by the guitar player Ronni Le Tekrø from TNT,  with the singer Jørn Lande and keyboard player Dag Stokke.

They released two albums, Vagabond (1994) and A Huge Fan Of Life (1995).

Biography
Vagabond was formed by ex-TNT members Ronni Le Tekrø and Morty Black in 1993, after the break up of TNT. They were joined by ex-Stage Dolls member Steinar Krokstad, TNT's live keyboard player Dag Stokke and, initially, Sons of Angels vocalist Solli, before Jørn Lande joined the line up.

Their first album, Vagabond, sold 10,000 copies in Norway, but they were dropped by the EMI label. They were then signed by the Japanese Victor label. Their second album, A Huge Fan of Life was released in Europe on the band's own record label.

Vagabond ended when TNT reformed in 1996, and subsequently the band members went their separate ways.

Line up
Jørn Lande - vocals
Ronni Le Tekrø - guitars, backing vocals
Dag Stokke - keyboards, backing vocals
Morty Black - bass guitar, backing vocals
Steinar Krokstad - drums, backing vocals

Discography

Albums

Vagabond (1994)
 Thunderblunder
 Key to the Rainbow
 Do You Like It?
 Gold in the Air
 I Believe in Wonders
 Silent Woman Sheila
 Automatic
 Let go, let go
 Mrs. Hippie Blues
 We bring the sun to you
 Better ask yourself
 Kick big pigs
 (Everybody's) Healing [Japanese bonus track]

A Huge Fan of Life (1995)
 Startrip Overload
 Give From Yourself
 Jammin' In Heaven
 Angels Serenade
 City In between
 Good Neighbours
 Dealer
 It's a Lullaby
 Follow Me
 Ding Dingaling
 Baby I Love You

2 (Compilation, 2012)

Singles

Key to the Rainbow (1994)
 Key to the Rainbow (radio edit)
 Key to the Rainbow (album version)
 (Everybody's) Healing

Silent Woman Sheila (1994)
 Silent Woman Sheila
 Let go, let go

External links
Rock Detector Vagabond page
Jørn Lande Official website 

Norwegian hard rock musical groups
Musical groups established in 1993
1993 establishments in Norway
Musical groups disestablished in 1996
1996 disestablishments in Norway
Musical groups from Norway with local place of origin missing